Renaud van Ruymbeke (born 19 August 1952) is an investigative magistrate, well known for specializing in political and financial corruption cases. He investigated the French-Taiwan Frigates Affair, which was related to the Clearstream, and the Urba Affair.

Bibliography 
Renaud van Ruymbeke, Le Juge d'instruction, Presses Universitaires de France, coll. « Que sais-je ? », 1988. 
Denis Robert, La justice ou le chaos, Stock, 1996. Interviews and portrait of seven anti-corruption judges: Bernard Bertossa, Edmondo Bruti Liberati, Gherardo Colombo, Benoît Dejemeppe, Baltasar Garzon Real, Carlos Jimenez Villarejo, Renaud Van Ruymbeke
9 May 2001 op-ed in Le Monde titled "The black box of financial globalization" with Bernard Bertossa, attorney general in Geneva, Benoît Dejemeppe, king's attorney in Bruxelles (procureur du roi), Eva Joly, judge (juge d'instruction) in Paris, and Jean de Maillard, magistrate in Blois, about the Clearstream scandal, available here.

See also 
fr:Affaire Urba
Clearstream

1952 births
Living people
Lycée Lakanal alumni
People from Neuilly-sur-Seine
21st-century French judges
French people of Flemish descent
20th-century French judges